Fantasia 3 is a 1966 Spanish fantasy film directed by Eloy de la Iglesia. It is based on three  fairy tales: Hans Christian Andersen’s "The Little Mermaid"; the 1900 children's novel, The Wonderful Wizard of Oz by L. Frank Baum and "The Devil with the Three Golden Hairs" by the Brothers Grimm. Fantasia 3 was de la iglesia's first feature-length film

Plot 
The film is an adaptation of three fairy tales classics of children literature.

"The Maiden of the Sea" tells the story of Coraline, a mermaid who wants to be human after she falls in love with a Sailor Prince.
"The 3 hairs of the Devil" tells the story of Tomasin, a young man of humble background, which a seer had a presentiment that he would marry the daughter of the king, who must perform a series of tests to avoid death, and marriage the princess is accepted by the king.
"The Wizard of Oz" tells the story of Sylvia, a girl who get lost in the woods with her dog Toto, and along with her friends The Scarecrow, The Tin Man and the Cowardly Lion, have been snatched the brain, heart and courage, respectively. They go  the Emerald City to request help from the Wizard of Oz
adapting three children’s stories:, The three hairs from the devil and The Wizard of Oz.

Cast
The Maid of the Sea 
Dyanik Zurakowska as Coralina 
Jorge Palacios as the sailor Prince
Sergio Mendizábal as the King Rey 
Argentina Cases as Princesa Astrid 
Marisol García as Sirena
Antonio Casas as Neptuno

The three hairs from the devil: 
Juan Diego as Tomasín 
Javier Loyola as the King 
Lola Losada as the Princess
Cris Huerta as Ottón 
Carmen Luján as the Queen
Tomás Blanco as the Devil

The Wizard of Oz
Maribel Martín as Silvia 
Manuel Andrés as Cowardly Lion
Javier de Campos as The Scarecrow
Italo Ricardi as The Tin Man
Antonia Mas as the mother 
Luis Prendes as the Wizard of Oz

External links
 

1966 films
Films based on Grimms' Fairy Tales
Films based on multiple works
Films based on The Little Mermaid
Films based on The Wizard of Oz
Films directed by Eloy de la Iglesia
Spanish fantasy films
1960s Spanish-language films
The Devil in film
Films based on fairy tales